Donat Acklin (born 6 June 1965 in Herznach) is a Swiss bobsledder who competed in the late 1980s and early 1990s. Competing in three Winter Olympics, he won four medals with two gold (Two-man: 1992, 1994), one silver (Four-man: 1994), and one bronze (Four-man: 1992).

Acklin also won three medals at the FIBT World Championships with one gold (Four-man: 1993) and two silvers (Two-man: 1993, Four-man: 1989).

References
 Bobsleigh two-man Olympic medalists 1932-56 and since 1964
 Bobsleigh four-man Olympic medalists for 1924, 1932-56, and since 1964
 Bobsleigh two-man world championship medalists since 1931
 Bobsleigh four-man world championship medalists since 1930

External links
 
 

1965 births
Bobsledders at the 1988 Winter Olympics
Bobsledders at the 1992 Winter Olympics
Bobsledders at the 1994 Winter Olympics
Living people
Olympic gold medalists for Switzerland
Olympic silver medalists for Switzerland
Olympic bronze medalists for Switzerland
Olympic bobsledders of Switzerland
Swiss male bobsledders
Olympic medalists in bobsleigh
Medalists at the 1992 Winter Olympics
Medalists at the 1994 Winter Olympics
20th-century Swiss people